Afronyctemera itokina is a moth of the family Erebidae first described by Per Olof Christopher Aurivillius in 1904. It is found in Angola, Burundi, Cameroon, the Democratic Republic of the Congo, Kenya, Malawi, Nigeria, Rwanda, Tanzania, Uganda and Zambia.

The larvae feed on Senecio species.

References

Moths described in 1904
Nyctemerina
Moths of Africa